The 2015 Al Habtoor Tennis Challenge was a professional tennis tournament played on outdoor hard courts. It was the eighteenth edition of the tournament and part of the 2015 ITF Women's Circuit, offering a total of $75,000 in prize money. It took place in Dubai, United Arab Emirates, on 9–15 November 2015.

Singles main draw entrants

Seeds 

 1 Rankings as of 2 November 2015

Other entrants 
The following players received wildcards into the singles main draw:
  Claudia Coppola
  Olga Fridman
  Dea Herdželaš
  Isabella Shinikova

The following players received entry from the qualifying draw:
  Nicoleta Dascălu
  Maria Marfutina
  Sandra Samir
  Cristina Sánchez Quintanar

Champions

Singles

 Çağla Büyükakçay def.  Klára Koukalová, 6–7(4–7), 6–4, 6–4

Doubles

 Çağla Büyükakçay /  Maria Sakkari def.  Elise Mertens /  İpek Soylu, 7–6(8–6), 6–4

External links 
 2015 Al Habtoor Tennis Challenge at ITFtennis.com
 Official website

2015 ITF Women's Circuit
2015
2015
2015 in Emirati tennis
Al Habtoor Tennis Challenge